Victor Joseph Jean Ambroise Ségoffin (5 March 1867 – 17 October 1925) was a French sculptor.

Biography
Born in Toulouse, Ségoffin's early education was at the Lycée Pierre-de-Fermat. After school he was admitted to the Toulouse School of Fine Arts in the studio of Charles Ponsin-Andarahy. In 1887, having become an orphan, he joined the army. He took further education at the École nationale supérieure des Beaux-Arts in Paris under Louis-Ernest Barrias and Pierre-Jules Cavelier. Ségoffin won the Prix de Rome for sculpture in 1897.  His work was part of the sculpture event in the art competition at the 1912 Summer Olympics.

In 1920 he was appointed head of the women's studio at the École des Beaux-Arts. In 1906 he was made a chevalier of the Légion d'honneur, and an officier in 1911. A street in Toulouse is named after him.

Works
His most notable works include:

 The war dance, marble, Musée d'Orsay, 1903–1905
 Sacred Mask Dance, bronze, Musée d'Orsay, 1905
 marble monument of Voltaire, meant for the Pantheon, now in the courtyard of the Lycée Voltaire, 1907–1921
 bronze Le Génie et le Temps, in the Cour Napoleon at the Louvre Palace, 1908, melted down during the German occupation
 bust of the Cuban-French poet José-Maria de Heredia, bronze, Jardin du Luxembourg
 Therese Combarieu, marble, Toulouse, Musée des Augustins
 Denise Combarieu, bronze, Toulouse, Musée des Augustins
 Emile Cartailhac, bronze, Museum of Toulouse, 1914

Gallery

References

Bibliography
Luce Rivet, "Victor Ségoffin (1867-1923)", Revue du Comminges, 2e trimestre 1988
Guillaume Peigné, Dictionnaire des sculpteurs néo-baroques français (1870-1914), Paris, CTHS, Coll. Format no 71, 2012, 559 p., p. 445-454

External links 
RKD
Benezit Dictionary of Artists online (subscription access only)
Base Joconde: Portail des collections des musées de France - Ségoffin
Online biography

1867 births
1925 deaths
Lycée Pierre-de-Fermat alumni
Prix de Rome for sculpture
Officiers of the Légion d'honneur
20th-century French sculptors
19th-century French sculptors
French male sculptors
Olympic competitors in art competitions
19th-century French male artists